The LNB Pro A Most Improved Player Award is an annual professional basketball award that is given by the top tier division in France, the LNB Pro A. It is awarded to the player who showed the most progress in a given season, as compared to the previous season.

Winners

References

LNB Pro A awards
European basketball awards